Blastomeryx is an extinct genus of musk deer endemic to North America. There may be only one species, Blastomeryx gemmifer.

Its canines were elongated into tusks which it probably used to uproot plants and fend off predators. While Blastomeryx (as well as modern musk deer) lacked antlers, a Middle Miocene species had bony knobs on its skull, which have been interpreted as incipient horns.

References

Prehistoric musk deer
Miocene even-toed ungulates
Pliocene even-toed ungulates
Piacenzian extinctions
Neogene mammals of North America
White River Fauna
Fossil taxa described in 1877
Prehistoric even-toed ungulate genera